This is a list of countries with McDonald's restaurants. McDonald's is the largest chain of fast-food restaurants in the world, with more than 36,000 outlets worldwide. The majority of McDonald's outlets outside of the United States are franchises.

The biggest temporary McDonald's restaurant in the world was opened during the 2012 Summer Olympics in London, which had . The biggest still standing is the World's Largest Entertainment McDonald's. The northernmost McDonald's restaurant in the world is located in Rovaniemi, Finland (after the restaurant in Murmansk, Russia was closed in 2022) and the southernmost in the world is located in Invercargill, New Zealand.

The list of countries follows the company's own calculation and contains several non-sovereign territories.

History 
The first McDonald's restaurant was opened in 1940 by Dick and Mac McDonald. However, on 15 April 1955, Ray Kroc launched the first McDonald's in Des Plaines, Illinois, featuring a ten-item menu built around a 15-cent hamburger.

Since that time, McDonald's has operated more than 40,000 restaurants worldwide, which has increased over 16 years.

Countries and territories with the first McDonald's outlet

Former locations

See also 

 Big Mac Index
 Dell Theory of Conflict Prevention
 Golden Arches Theory of Conflict Prevention
 International availability of McDonald's products
 List of countries with Burger King franchises
 List of countries with KFC franchises
 List of countries with Jollibee outlets
 List of sovereign states
 Lists of restaurants
 MaDonal
 List of countries with IKEA stores
 McDonaldization
 McWorld

References

External links 
 McDonald's countries
 Another chronology of openings
 Alternate chronology

McDonald's
McDonald's Restaurants
McDonald's Restaurants